American Commissioners of the Preliminary Peace Agreement with Great Britain, also known as the Treaty of Paris, is a 1783 unfinished painting by Benjamin West depicting the United States delegation that negotiated the 1783 Treaty of Paris, which formally ended the American Revolutionary War. Peace negotiations began in Paris on June 25, 1783, and the eventual signing of the treaty took place on September 3, 1783 at the Hotel York at 56 rue Jacob. The green drapery in the painting's background and the distant landscape with a classical colonnaded building emphasize the scene's formality.

John Jay, John Adams, Benjamin Franklin, Henry Laurens, and William Temple Franklin (presented from left to right) are depicted early during the negotiation process (Laurens and the younger Franklin were not present at the treaty's signing). Benjamin Franklin was the only U.S. delegate who did not pose in person; West drew his likeness from an engraving.

Meant to be depicted on the right, the British delegation comprising representative Richard Oswald and his secretary, Caleb Whitefoord, declined to pose. Britain had no desire to commemorate its defeat, and Oswald was reportedly ugly and blind in one eye and consequently reluctant to be depicted. The conspicuous absence of the British commissioners evokes the "tentative nature of the peace" and the "deep geopolitical antagonisms" that persisted after the Revolution. West never completed his painting. According to John Quincy Adams, West intended to present the painting as a gift to Congress.

The painting, a gift of Henry Francis du Pont, is in the permanent collection of the Winterthur Museum, Garden and Library, du Pont's former home in Winterthur, Delaware. Du Pont had purchased the work from the J. P. Morgan collection in 1948. The painting was displayed at the Metropolitan Museum of Art in 2016 as part of an exhibition on unfinished paintings.

References

1783 paintings
cultural depictions of Benjamin Franklin
cultural depictions of John Adams
John Jay
paintings about the American Revolution
paintings by Benjamin West
paintings in Delaware
unfinished paintings
Collections of the Winterthur Museum, Garden and Library